Cosimo Filane-Figliomeni is a Canadian musician and businessperson.

Biography

Early life and education
Cosimo Figliomeni chose the stage name "Filane" by using the first syllable of his last name and the last name of his favorite singer, Frankie Laine.

Career
Filane has completed six albums, recorded in Toronto and in the US. Some of his tracks were featured on the prestigious CHUM Charts, including his single "My Girl". His first album was released in 1966 and most recent album released in 2020. In 1999, he was featured on the Canadian Broadcasting Corporation documentary series "A Scattering of Seeds", and in 2002 on the CBC series Personal Best. Filane is author of a novel on minor hockey and, in 2009, was named an "RBC Regional Hockey Leader" for his volunteer work with amateur hockey in northwestern Ontario. The Filane family operates several businesses in Schreiber, Ontario: the Cosiana Inn, the Fallen Rock Resort, Hollywood Filane Sportswear & Boxing Gym, Filane's Can-op & Variety, Filane's Dollar 'n' More, Filane's Food Market and Filane's Natural Spring Water.

Marriage and children
Cosimo and Diana Filane Figliomeni have eight children: Domenic, Gerry, Edith, Dean, Salvatore, Shawn, Deana, and Mario.

Discography
Small Town Boy (Troika Publishing, 1966)
This Is It! (Fallen Rock, 1973)
Love Me the Way That I Am (Fallen Rock, 1978)
I'm Gonna Try it Again!(Fallen Rock, 1983)
I Like It! (Fallen Rock, 2011)
Forget About It! (Cosiana Music, 2020)

Published works
You Can't Win Them All (Fallen Rock Productions and Cosiana Music, 1986)

References

External links
Filane's

Year of birth missing (living people)
Living people
Businesspeople from Ontario
Canadian male singers
Canadian people of Italian descent
Musicians from Ontario
People from Thunder Bay District